Metabolic intermediates are molecules that are the precursors or metabolites of biologically significant molecules.

Although these intermediates are of relatively minor direct importance to cellular function, they can play important roles in the allosteric regulation of enzymes.

Clinical significance
Some can be useful in measuring rates of metabolic processes (for example, 3,4-dihydroxyphenylacetic acid or 3-aminoisobutyrate).

Because they can represent unnatural points of entry into natural metabolic pathways, some (such as AICA ribonucleotide) are of interest to researchers in developing new therapies.

See also
 Metabolism

Metabolism